Skate Safe America is a roller hockey facility located in Old Bethpage, New York.  It is the home of the New York Shock Exchange of the Men's Roller Derby Association (MRDA). "Skate Safe America" is also home to the AIHL (American Inline Hockey League") Long Island 495ers. Skate Safe America is a roller hockey rink, without free skate sessions to the public; only roller hockey games, clinics, camps, lessons and parties are held in the facility.

External links
 Skate Safe America official site

Roller skating rinks
Sports venues in Long Island
Old Bethpage, New York
Buildings and structures in Nassau County, New York